East Runton Cliffs is a  geological Site of Special Scientific Interest west of Cromer in Norfolk. It is a Geological Conservation Review site.

The foreshore exposes Lower Pleistocene sediments, including large blocks of glacitectonic (transported by ice) chalk. There are many fossils, including extinct horses, rhinoceroses, and elephants.

The site is open to the public.

References

Sites of Special Scientific Interest in Norfolk
Geological Conservation Review sites